Sharpe's Revenge is a British television drama, the 12th of a series that follows the career of Richard Sharpe, a British soldier during the Napoleonic Wars. The adaptation is based on the 1989 novel of the same name by Bernard Cornwell.

Plot summary

Sharpe participates in the Battle of Toulouse, at the end of the Peninsular War. On the other side are French General Calvet (John Benfield) and Sharpe's nemesis, Ducos (Féodor Atkine), who is in charge of Napoleon's treasury. During the fighting, Sharpe encounters and humiliates Ducos, but lets him escape with his life. Napoleon loses the war and is sent into exile.

Before the battle, Sharpe gives his wife Jane (Abigail Cruttenden) power of attorney over his entire fortune of 10,000 guineas, just in case. She extracts a promise from him that this will be his last fight, that he will ask Wellington for a transfer back to England. However, Sharpe is insulted by another British officer; forgetting his promise, he exacts revenge by shooting the officer in the buttocks in a duel. Infuriated, Jane is persuaded by her friend Lady Molly Spindacre (Connie Hyde) to run away to London to spend some of her husband's money.

Things get out of hand when Jane becomes infatuated with the handsome Lord Rossendale (Alexis Denisof). After they become lovers, he convinces her to invest her money in various projects and pay off his gambling debts. Eventually, she runs out of money, at which point her "friend" Molly deserts her.

Meanwhile, Ducos is ordered by Calvet to take the treasure to Paris, but with the war lost, steals it instead, framing Sharpe for the theft and murder of the guards. Sharpe is brought before a military tribunal and jailed pending the arrival of a purported witness, Colonel Maillot (Stéphane Cornicard), the officer in charge of the treasure's escort. In actuality, the Frenchman had rebuffed Ducos' offer to share the loot and had gone home to Normandy in disgust.

Sharpe's friends Sergeant Patrick Harper (Daragh O'Malley) and Captain Frederickson (Philip Whitchurch) break him out of prison and all three head off to find Maillot. They arrive too late; Ducos has had him murdered shortly before to cover his tracks. Sharpe is wounded by Maillot's widowed sister, Madame Lucille DuBert (Cécile Paoli), when she mistakes him for one of her brother's killers. While he recuperates, they become romantically involved, to the dismay of Captain Frederickson who had been interested in Madame DuBert.

In Paris, Frederickson learns the whereabouts of Ducos and is contacted by Calvet. Sharpe joins forces with the Frenchman and his loyal Imperial guardsmen. Together, they storm Ducos' fortress in Naples. Sharpe shoots his nemesis at long range and Calvet recovers the treasure. Between them, Calvet and Madame DuBert clear Sharpe's name.

Cast
 Sean Bean – Major Richard Sharpe
 Daragh O'Malley – Sergeant Major Patrick Harper
 Abigail Cruttenden – Jane Sharpe
 Philip Whitchurch – Captain William Frederickson
 Cécile Paoli – Madame Lucille DuBert
 Alexis Denisof – Lord Rossendale
 Féodor Atkine – Major Pierre Ducos
 James Laurenson – Major General Ross
 John Benfield – General Calvet
 Connie Hyde – Lady Molly Spindacre
 Tom Hodgkins – Wigram
 Stéphane Cornicard – Colonel Maillot
 Phil Smeeton – Sergeant Challon
 Michael Fitzgerald – Major Salmon
 Milton Johns – Hopkinson
 Paul Brooke – Roland
 Leon Lissek - Juliot

Home video
The first 14 episodes of the series were released on DVD by BFS Entertainment on 24 April 2001.

References

External links
 

1997 British television episodes
1990s historical films
1990s war films
Films based on British novels
Films based on historical novels
Films based on military novels
Napoleonic Wars films
Revenge
War television films
Fiction set in 1814
Films directed by Tom Clegg (director)